Petrus Andreas Maria (Peter) Bos (born 20 June 1950, in Amsterdam) is a Dutch film, stage and television actor best known for his role in the 1982 children's television series De Zevensprong in which he played the leading part as the teacher Frans van der Steg. He is also known from the children's film Knokken voor twee (directed by Karst van der Meulen) which was released in the same year.

Filmography

Television
 De zevensprong (13 episodes, 1982) as Frans van der Steg
 Zondag weet je alles (1985) as Andre
 De wandelaar (1989) as Simon Veldman
 Uit de school geklapt (1992) as Joop de Wit

Film
 Knokken voor twee (1982) as Walter (English title: Three is a Crowd)
 Man in de war (1984) as Henk Berkhout
 Mama is boos! (1986) as Albert Koning K.P.R.
 De finales (1990) as Vader van Abe
 Romeo (1990) as Kennis op bezoek
 De bunker (1992) as Dekker
 Het schaduwrijk (1993) as Paul Curzon

References

External links
 
 Peter Bos at Cinema.nl

1950 births
Living people
Dutch male film actors
Male actors from Amsterdam
20th-century Dutch people